Pidikhtos, is a Greek folk dance with Cretan origin, dancing in a circle formation. It is very widespread in Crete and the Greek islands.

See also
Music of Greece
Greek dances

External links
Kρητικός πηδηχτός χορός - Cretan pidiktos
 

Greek dances